"War Veteran" is a science fiction short story by American writer Philip K. Dick. It was first published in If magazine in March 1955.

Plot summary
The plot concerns an old man who claims to have travelled back in time from a future in which Earth has lost a devastating war to its own Martian and Venusian colonies. The man turns out to be a synthetic human, designed to trick the Earth people into believing they could never win the war, forcing them to make peace. This type of android is a forerunner of the type appearing in Dick's novel Do Androids Dream of Electric Sheep? and its film adaptation.

A similar, supposedly time-displaced "war veteran" character appears in Dick's novel The Zap Gun.

References

External links

1955 short stories
Short stories by Philip K. Dick
Works originally published in If (magazine)